MV Coelleira was a Spanish-owned fishing vessel which was built in 1970 in the Netherlands. It was wrecked on 4 August 2019 on the Ve Skerries, Shetland.

Description 
The vessel was built in 1970 by Scheepswerf Haak in Zaandam, Netherlands, and was originally named Poolster. In 2007, the vessel was renamed Coelleira.

Wrecking 

Apart from the low light, the conditions were ideal – there was clear visibility, smooth seas and light winds. At 21:42, the heading was set to 204°.

At 22:30, the skipper (a 56-year-old Spanish national) took over watch from the mate, who went to bed. The skipper over the next two hours made five adjustments to the ship's heading in order to follow the coast. The skipper during this time worked on fish-landing records and other managerial work. It is not known how often the vessel's position was checked.

The skipper did not see any hazards on the chartplotter, and while he did see a lighthouse light towards the port bow, he assumed it was a lighthouse on the mainland.

The crew awoke with the sound of the collision, whereupon they assembled in the wheelhouse and donned survival suits and life jackets. Two lifeboats were launched off the starboard side. At 01:29, the Shetland Coastguard were notified of the accident, and in response the Aith lifeboat and a rescue helicopter were sent to the scene. All 15 crew were winched aboard the helicopter, and were returned to the emergency landing site at Clickimin in Lerwick uninjured.

Attempts were subsequently made to refloat the vessel. The ship was surveyed with assistance from the Sullom Voe Terminal tug Tystie; however, during the inspection the vessel rolled 5–10° to port, at which point the men aboard evacuated. The emergency towing vessel Ievoli Black attempted to pull Coelleira off the Clubb on 7 August; however, during the attempt the ship tilted over 55° to port, and with a forecast of poor sea conditions and weather the ship was deemed unsalvageable. In the following days the ship broke up and sank.

In its report on the incident, the Marine Accident Investigation Branch concluded that the planning of the passage between the fishing grounds and Scrabster was inadequate, the ship's position was not kept track of, and the bridge was empty when the ship ran aground. They suggested that the skipper's decision making may have been impacted by fatigue, while the set-up of the bridge's controls may have made it more difficult to observe risks to the ship.

See also 

 List of shipwrecks of the United Kingdom

Citations

General sources 

 
 
 
 

1970 ships
Fishing history of Shetland
Fishing vessels of the United Kingdom
Maritime incidents in 2019
Ships sunk in collisions
Ships sunk with no fatalities
2019 in Scotland